Max Graham (born April 17, 1971) is a British-Canadian DJ, composer, and producer of dance music. Known for fusing progressive house, trance, and techno, he is most famous for his open-to-close DJ Sets (where he typically plays 6 to 8 hours),  his Cycles CD series/radio show, and his remix of the classic song "Owner of a Lonely Heart" (by Yes) in 2005. He is also the founder of record labels Re*Brand and Cycles.

Biography
Graham was born in London, England, and lived in Spain, New York City and Los Angeles before settling in Ottawa, Canada, in 1989. At age 15, in 1986, he began as a hip-hop DJ before discovering dance music in the 1990s. He was a resident DJ at the famed Atomic Nightclub in Ottawa from 1997–2001. He has been touring globally as a DJ and producing melodic dance music since 2000.

Career

1997–2001: Atomic Nightclub, Hope Recordings 
During his residency at Atomic Nightclub, Graham was discovered by label executives and signed to Hope Recordings; one of his first productions, “Airtight”, was noticed by Nick Warren and Paul Oakenfold in 2000. Oakenfold subsequently put two of Graham's tracks on his album Another World. Tiesto also put “Airtight” on his In Search of Sunrise 2 album. That same year, “Airtight” was nominated for a Juno Award. He gained immediate acclaim and was voted #23 in the DJMag top 100 DJs for 2001 and was chosen to mix the famous Tranceport CD Series (Tranceport 4) that year.

2002–04: ShineMusic and the "sidechain" mixes 
Graham created the "Shine" concept in 2002, which included a mix CD, a label (Shinemusic), and club nights.
In 2004, Graham signed two singles to Sander Kleinenberg's Little Mountain label, entitled "Does She Know Yet?" and "Automatic Weapon". His remixes at the time went by the name "Max Graham's Sidechain Mix", named after the bass-pad sound that was heavily sidechained in his tracks. Included in these remixes was Guy Gerber's “Stoppage Time”, released on John Digweed's Bedrock Label.

2005–06: “Owner Of A Lonely Heart”, Essential Mix 
Graham produced a bootleg remix of Yes track "Owner of a Lonely Heart", which was played on BBC Radio 1 and signed by Ministry of Sound and released globally. It reached #9 in the UK, giving Graham his first Top-10 UK Hit. During this same period, Graham was signed to the Bullitt agency and released music on Deep Dish's Yoshitoshi Recordings, including the single "Crank". 2006 saw him invited for his first Essential Mix.

2008–10: Armada, Cycles and Radio (Artist album) 
In 2008, Graham shifted to a more melodic sound and signed with Armada Music. He began his CD series Cycles, which featured 8 compilations throughout the series, including a selection of progressive and trance songs.
In 2010, he release his first artist album, Radio, which included collaborations with Jessica Riddle, Neev Kennedy, Ana Criado and Protoculture.

2011–14: open-to-close sets, trance, and The Evil ID 
From 2008 to 2017, Graham released a new Cycles CD almost every year as a self-proclaimed “snapshot” of his current DJ sound. He also began touring exclusively playing open-to-close shows, where he focused on a wide variety of genres and a true journey of music. Producing under his own name, he made singles "Sun In The Winter", "Nothing Else Matters", and the hit "The Evil ID", which was championed by Armin Van Buuren at Tomorrowland. Graham also performed regularly at A State Of Trance shows. During that period, Graham teamed up with Protoculture to release a string of singles and remixes, including a remake of Grace’s "Not Over Yet".

2015–17: Leaving Armada, moving away from trance, changing sound 
In 2015, Graham began to move away from trance (due to the changing sound that no longer appealed to him) and left Armada, closing down his Rebrand label in the process. His sound changed, and he started the label Cycles with Black Hole Recordings. This period saw more underground releases, like "Redemption" and "One Hundred", and showcased deeper sounds such as the tracks "Argentina"  and "Sunrise in Flight". He also collaborated with Estiva on the track "Generation".

2017: The End of Cycles
In late 2017, Graham announced via Facebook that he was ending the weekly Cycles Radio episodes and taking an extended break from touring and making music.

2019: The Return
In 2019, Graham returned to the scene and announced via social media in August that he was in the studio working on his second artist album as well as relaunching Cycles Radio with a new monthly format. In March 2021, however, Graham announced that he would be taking another indefinite hiatus.

DJing 
Graham is known mostly these days as a DJ for his open-to-close sets, where he typically plays 6–8 hours. He has performed on Above and Beyond's Group Therapy Radio (multiple times), Pete Tong's Essential Mix, John Digweed's Transitions, and Armin van Buuren's A State of Trance. He has toured to over 75 countries and performed at such festivals as Ultra, Tomorrowland and Dance Valley as well as performed at some of the most famed venues in the world, including Pacha, Ibiza; Ushuaia, Ibiza; Twilo, New York; Space Terrace, Miami; and open-to-close sets at Cielo, New York, and Output, New York.

Production 
Graham's production varies in genre and has been at times hard to classify. Under his name, he makes predominantly progressive house and progressive trance, while he also makes techno under the alias Shelter.

Label Ownership 
He has owned three record labels: ShineMusic, Rebrand Records and Cycles Music. In total, he hosted Cycles Radio for 337 episodes from

Discography

Studio albums

 2010: Radio – Armada Music

Mix albums

 1996: A Delicate Sound of Many – Unknown
 2000: Cream CD2 – Yul Records
 2001: Transport 4 – Kinetic Records
 2004: Shine – System Recordings
 2005: Mixmag Live – DMC
 2007: Bal En Blanc – Bal En Blanc
 2008: Re*Brand, The Story so Far – Armada Music
 2008: Max Graham Presents Cycles – Armada Music
 2010: Max Graham Presents Cycles2 – Armada Music
 2011: Max Graham Presents Cycles3 – Armada Music
 2013: Max Graham Presents Cycles4 – Armada Music
 2014: Max Graham Presents Cycles5 – Armada Music
 2015: Cycles6 Mixed by Max Graham – Armada Music
 2016: Cycles7 Mixed by Max Graham – Black Hole Recordings
 2017: Cycles8 Mixed by Max Graham – Black Hole Recordings

Singles

 2000: Love the Bomb – Teknology
 2000: Backdraft – Hope Recordings
 2001: Shoreline – Hope Recordings
 2001: Bar None – Hope Recordings
 2001: Airtight – Hope Recordings
 2001: Yaletown – Hope Recordings
 2001: Skyline – Hope Recordings
 2001: Falling Together – Hope Recordings
 2001: Sepia – Hope Recordings
 2001: Dying to Survive – Hope Recordings
 2002: Tell You – Hope Recordings
 2004: Coastline – Shinemusic
 2004: Does She Know Yet – Little Mountain Recordings
 2004: Automatic Weapon – Little Mountain Recordings
 2005: Gone Feat Jessica Riddle – Shinemusic
 2005: Owner of a Lonely Heart vs Yes – Ministry of Sound Record Label
 2005: Crank – Yoshitoshi Recordings
 2006: Space Disco – Re*Brand Records
 2006: Cosmic Funk – Re*Brand Records
 2007: Smack – Re*Brand Records
 2008: Carbine – Re*Brand Records w/ Armada Music
 2008: Turkish Delight – Re*Brand Records w/ Armada Music
 2008: Frozen – Re*Brand Records w/ Armada Music
 2008: The Power of One – Re*Brand Records w/ Armada Music
 2008: Clear View Feat Jessica Riddle – Tell me – Re*Brand Records w/ Armada Music
 2010: Sun in the Winter Feat Neev Kennedy – Coldharbour Recordings
 2010: Dusky 2010 (Does She Know Yet) – Re*Brand Records w/ Armada Music
 2010: Nothing Else Matters Feat Ana Criado – Re*Brand Records w/ Armada Music
 2011: F.Y.C. – Re*Brand Records w/ Armada Music
 2011: So Caught Up feat Neev Kennedy Armada Music
 2012: Still There's You Feat Jeza – Re*Brand Records w/ Armada Music
 2012: Sona – Re*Brand Records w/ Armada Music
 2013: Where You Are Feat Alana Aldea – Re*Brand Records w/ Armada Music
 2013: Diamonds with Tania Zygar – Re*Brand Records w/ Armada Music
 2013: The Evil ID – Re*Brand Records w/ Armada Music
 2014: Lekker with Maarten de Jong – Re*Brand Records w/ Armada Music
 2014: Axiom with Protoculture – Re*Brand Records w/ Armada Music
 2014: Purple – Re*Brand Records w/ Armada Music
 2015: Rock Steady (as Shelter) – Yin Yang 
 2015: Redemption – Cycles w/ Black Hole Recordings
 2015: Pinned (as Shelter) – Yin Yang 
 2015: One Hundred (Late Night Mix; Raw Mix) – Cycles w/ Black Hole Recordings
 2015: Sunrise in Flight / Argentina – Cycles Blackhole Recordings
 2016: End Beginning – Cycles w/ Black Hole Recordings
 2016: Amnesia – Cycles w/ Black Hole Recordings
 2017: Generation with Estiva – Cycles w/ Black Hole Recordings
 2017: BCN – Cycles w/ Black Hole Recordings
 2017: Guiding Light feat. Neev Kennedy – Cycles w/ Black Hole Recordings

Remixes

 2000: Bullitt – Cried to Dream – Virgin Music
 2000: Starecase – Lost 22 – Hope Recordings
 2000: Subgod – Velodrome TV – Polyester
 2000: Vicious Cycles – Vicious Cycles – Platipus Records
 2001: Uberzone – Bounce – Astralwerks
 2001: Conjure One – Redemption – Nettwerk
 2001: globe – Can't Stop Fallin' In Love – Avex Trax
 2002: Conjure One – Sleep – Nettwerk
 2002: Cultivate – Broken Pieces – Lost Language
 2002: Barakka – Song to the Siren – Lost Language
 2003: Strawberry Fields – Release Records
 2004: Madoka – Afterburner – Private Reality
 2004: Jase From Outta Space – Do What You Want – Shine Music
 2004: Tilt – Twelve – Lost Language
 2004: DT8 Project – Winter – Data Records
 2005: Sam Perez – Across the Ocean – Yoshitoshi
 2005: Leah – Contact High – Wooden Records
 2006: Filterheadz – Endless Summer – Love Distortion
 2007: Purple Code – The Rising – Re*Brand Records
 2008: Marcus Schossow – Swedish Beatballs – Coldharbour
 2008: Jerome Isma – Vila Nova – Electric
 2010: tyDi Feat. Tanya Zygar – Half Light – AVA Recordings
 2010: Filo & Peri ft. Audrey Gallagher – This Night – VANDIT
 2011: Grace – Not Over Yet w/ Protoculture – Perfecto
 2011: Protoculture – Topaz – Re*Brand Records w/ Armada Music
 2012: Solarstone & Scott Bond – 3rd Earth – Captivating Sounds w/ Armada Music
 2013: Gabriel & Dresden ft. Neil Ormandy – Tomorrow Comes w/ Protoculture – Organized Nature w/ Armada Music
 2015: Solid Stone ft. Jennifer Rene – Not Enough – Re*Brand Records w/ Armada Music
 2017: Forerunners – Relic – Cycles w/ Black Hole Recordings
 2019: Michael & Levan with Stiven Rivic – Stardust – Kunai Music

DJ Magazine Top 100 rankings
 2001: No. 23 (Debut)
 2002: No. 83 
 2003: No. 56
 2004: No. 64
 2005: No. 96

References

External links
 
 Max Graham Interview (2010)
 Owner of A Lonely Heart Video
 Assured DJ Agency
 TranceSound.net interview with Max Graham on September 2008
 Max Graham at myspace.com
 Max Graham at beatfactor.net
 Max Graham at discogs.com
 Max Graham at thedjlist.com

1971 births
Canadian electronic musicians
Canadian house musicians
Living people
DJs from London
Musicians from Ottawa
Armada Music artists
Canadian DJs
Canadian people of English descent
Progressive house musicians
Electronic dance music DJs